Jarun is a neighborhood in the southwestern part of Zagreb, Croatia. It was named after Lake Jarun, formed by the Sava River, now located on the southern edge of the neighborhood.

Lake
The lake is the location of the Jarun sports and leisure center, where people can row, paddle, sail, surf, swim, jog, bike, roller skate, and skateboard. Around the lake are many nightclubs and cafes such as Aquarius. Jarun Lake is currently a home of INmusic festival. 
Also, around the lake Jarun there is a "Walk of fame" with the pictures and biography information of great athletes of Croatian sport.

Neighborhood

The area covered by the local city council Jarun is 398.06 hectares, with 12,149 inhabitants (2011).

The development of Jarun began at the end of the 1970s when it was merely a village, with the building of apartment blocks. Development increased in 1987 due to the building of the sports and leisure center (because of the Universiade in Zagreb the same year). It is currently a middle-class neighborhood with a very low crime rate.

The borders of Jarun are Horvaćanska Street to the north with Staglišće, Hrvatski Sokol Street with Vrbani to the west, Vrapčak Creek with Gredice to the east, and the Sava River to the south. Jarun, in the wider sense, also includes the neighborhoods of Staglišće and Gredice.

See also
INmusic festival
1987 Summer Universiade

References

External links

 TD Jarun
 Jarun online
 Aquarius Zagreb

Neighbourhoods of Zagreb
Trešnjevka
Olympic rowing venues
Sports venues in Zagreb